Pedro Roque Favier (13 March 1968 – 24 May 2015) was a Cuban Greco-Roman wrestler who was world champion in 1987.

References

1968 births
2015 deaths
Cuban male sport wrestlers
Pan American Games medalists in wrestling
Pan American Games gold medalists for Cuba
Wrestlers at the 1987 Pan American Games
20th-century Cuban people
21st-century Cuban people